Fountain Way is a mental health facility in Salisbury, Wiltshire, England. It is managed by the Avon and Wiltshire Mental Health Partnership NHS Trust which is based in Chippenham, Wiltshire.

History
The hospital, which replaced the Old Manor Hospital, opened on the southern part of the site of the facility which it replaced in 2003. The name derives from the Grade II listed fountain that stands in the entrance of the old hospital site.

Services
The hospital wards are as follows:

Administration offices for the Assertive Outreach Team
Ashdown Ward – a secure psychiatric intensive care unit
Amblescroft North – a secure assessment ward for elderly people with mental health problems
Amblescroft South – a secure ward for elderly people with continuing mental health problems
Beechlydene Ward – a psychiatric inpatient ward for adults
Foxley Green – administration offices; used for the treatment and support of people with drug and alcohol problems until that service was awarded to the Turning Point charity in January 2013
Grovely – formerly a day hospital which closed in 2010; in 2014 it reopened as a base for mental health community teams
Heathwood – a day facility providing psychological therapies and physiotherapy
Memory services.

See also
Healthcare in Bristol
Healthcare in Somerset
Healthcare in Wiltshire
List of hospitals in England

References

External links
Official site

Hospital buildings completed in 2003
Psychiatric hospitals in England
NHS hospitals in England
Hospitals in Wiltshire
Buildings and structures in Salisbury